The Force is a metaphysical power in the Star Wars fictional universe.

The Force may also refer to:

Television and film 
The Force (2017 film), a 2017 American documentary
The Force (2009 TV series), a British television series on Channel 4
The Force: Behind the Line, an Australian documentary television series
The Force (advertisement), a 2011 television advertisement for Volkswagen's Passat
The Force: Manchester, BBC TV series
The Force: Essex, a British television programme documenting the work of Essex Police

Music 
The Force (band), an American punk rock group
The Force (Kool & the Gang album), 1977
The Force (Onslaught album), 1986

Other uses 
Police force, the local law enforcement body
Western Force, a rugby union team from Perth, Australia
"The Force", nickname of snooker player Peter Ebdon

See also
Force (disambiguation)